Leo Delcroix (21 November 1949 – 2 November 2022) was a Belgian Flemish politician. He was a member of the Christian People's Party (CVP).

Biography

Political career
Delcroix earned a degree in classical philology from the University of Antwerp, a law degree from KU Leuven, and later studied economics at the Limburg Universitair Centrum. He also carried out reforms within the Belgian Armed Forces with a considerable reduction in the number of soldiers, weapons, and barracks and froze the military budget for five years. He was a founding member of the Eurocorps and increasingly deployed the Belgian Armed Forces for operations in Yugoslavia, Somalia, and Rwanda.

In 1995, Delcroix was elected to the Flemish Parliament, where he remained until 1999. During that time, he was also a  within the Senate. Delcroix was considered to be on the right side of the CVP and repeatedly questioned the cordon sanitaire within the Vlaams Blok. In 1999, he retired from politics.

After politics
In January 2001, Delcroix became director of the Maastricht School of Management. He resigned in October 2003 following his criminal conviction for his role in the "Milieubox affair". He received a boarding premium of 150,000 euros.

In September 2010, he succeeded Theo Kelchtermans as chairman of Hasselt University. He resigned in October 2019 due to health concerns and was succeeded by Jo Vandeurzen.

Controversies
In November 1994, Delcroix was criticized over his ownership of a villa in Bormes-les-Mimosas, France, and unreported employment for workers who were employed at the residence. After the insistence of CVP party leader Johan Van Hecke, he resigned from his role as Minister of Defense.

However, he was not officially charged in most cases. On 30 June 2004, he was acquitted by a court of appeal because the offenses were time-barred.

In 2013, Delcroix was again accused of misconduct in relation to the Belgian delegation at Expo 2010 in Shanghai, for which he was questioned by the Court of Audit. The Court stated in 2013 that "so many rules were broken that control of the finances was simply impossible". Despite this, he was appointed Commissioner General for Expo 2015 in Milan two years later. The Court of Audit again criticized the management of the Belgian delegation at the Expo in 2017.

Death
Leo Delcroix died on 2 November 2022, at the age of 72.

References

1949 births
2022 deaths
Members of the Senate (Belgium)
Members of the Flemish Parliament
Belgian Ministers of Defence
20th-century Belgian politicians
Christian Democratic and Flemish politicians
University of Antwerp alumni
KU Leuven alumni
People from Kalmthout
Belgian bloggers